Hilmar Verbeek (born 23 August 1999) is a Dutch rower. He was born in Maastricht, Netherlands, where he rowed as a junior rower and competed twice at the Coupe de la Jeunesse. Currently, Verbeek lives in Delft to study Life Sciences at Delft University of Technology and Leiden University. Verbeek now rows in Rotterdam at the A.R.S.R. "Skadi" club.

He won a silver medal at the 2019 European Rowing Championships.

Results

European Championships
 2019 – Silver, Lightweight quadruple sculls

World Cup
 2019 – 5th place, Lightweight quadruple sculls (World Rowing Cup III, Rotterdam)

References

External links

1999 births
Living people
Dutch male rowers
European Rowing Championships medalists